Frank E. Mann (May 1, 1920 – April 25, 2007) was a politician from the state of Virginia. He served as mayor of Alexandria from 1961 to 1967 as a Democrat and again from 1976 to 1979 as an independent. He was also a member of the Virginia House of Delegates from 1970 to 1975.

Early life

Frank Mann was born in Atlanta, Georgia on May 1, 1920, and moved to Washington, D.C. as a boy. His mother was a descendant of Alexandria's historic Lee family. He graduated from McKinley Technology High School and was a 1941 graduate of George Washington University. During World War II, he served with the Seabees in the Navy and won a Bronze Star. He married Patricia Horne in 1940 and that marriage later ended in divorce. He later married Anita Rowland Izo of Alexandria in 1975 whom he was married to until his death. At the time of his death he had a daughter from his first marriage, Patty Lee Briggs of Laurel; two stepchildren, Amy Izo Fang of Arlington and Eric Izo of New York; seven grandchildren; and two great-grandchildren.

Politics

Mann was elected mayor of Alexandria, Virginia in 1961, and served nine years, but not consecutively. During his first two terms as mayor, Mann refused a salary, instead giving it to city employees seeking specialized training.

He left his position as mayor in 1967, and ran for the Virginia House of Delegates in 1969. He was elected to succeed Marion Galland and spent five years in the Virginia General Assembly (a part-time position) alongside conservative Democrat James McIlhany Thomson, during which the district's numbering changed.

Mann ran for mayor again in 1976 as an Independent. He defeated Democrat Melvin Bergheim and served until 1979, when he was defeated for reelection by Charles E. Beatley (whom he had succeeded) by a nearly two to one margin. Mann never held elected office again.

Death

Mann died on April 25, 2007 of prostate cancer at his home in Old Town Alexandria. He was survived by his wife of thirty two years, Anita Rowland Mann, and three children and step-children.

References

External links

Historical Bio for Frank E. Mann
Washington Post obituary

1920 births
2007 deaths
Deaths from cancer in Virginia
Deaths from prostate cancer
George Washington University alumni
Mayors of Alexandria, Virginia
Members of the Virginia House of Delegates
Politicians from Atlanta
People from Fairfax County, Virginia
Seabees
Virginia Democrats
Virginia Independents
Lee family of Virginia
United States Navy personnel of World War II